Legazpi is a city in the Gipuzkoa province of the Autonomous Community of the Basque Country, northern Spain.

Legazpi is a town of about 9,000 inhabitants located on top of the Urola valley, in Gipuzkoa. Surrounded by mountains, and at the foot of the Aizkorri mountain range, its predominant economic activity is industrial (manufacturing, metal processing, plastics).

The rich industrial tradition of Legazpi goes back to the High Middle Ages, when transformation of iron ore was achieved by means of the haizeolak ("ironworks moved by wind"). During the 14th century, wind energy came to be replaced by water in the metal processing with the foundation of several "ironworks propelled by water" (ur 'water' and ola originally 'shack', are the two lexical components of "Urola", a river crossing Legazpi). This industrial tradition had its continuity in modern times, and Legazpi became one of the most important metallurgic centres in the industrialised modern Basque Country.

One of the 14th century ironworks (called Mirandaola) has remained in place to date like nowhere else in the Basque Country. It is the heart of a thematic park with an educational and touristy vocation, where traditions and ways of living from the past are shown.

References

External links
Legazpi municipal government website
 LEGAZPI in the Bernardo Estornés Lasa - Auñamendi Encyclopedia (Euskomedia Fundazioa) 

Municipalities in Gipuzkoa